Operation Flipper (also called the Rommel Raid) was a British commando raid during the Second World War, mainly by men from No. 11 (Scottish) Commando. It was timed for the night of 17/18 November 1941, just before the start of Operation Crusader. The operation failed as Rommel had left the target house weeks earlier and all but two of the commandos who landed were killed or captured. One member of the Special Boat Section team, who had secured the beach for the commando party, also escaped.

Planning
From October to November 1941, a plan was formulated at Eighth Army headquarters to attack: (data from Jones 2006 unless indicated)
 a wireless station and intelligence centre at Apollonia
 an Italian headquarters and communications cable mast at Cyrene
 the headquarters of the Italian Trieste Division near Slonta

Although not specified in the orders, the goal of the raid was to kill or capture Rommel, to disrupt German organisation before the start of Crusader. Rommel's headquarters was believed to be at Beda Littoria, because Captain John Haselden had reconnoitred the area disguised as an Arab and reported that Rommel's staff car came and went from the former Prefecture. The operation was led by Lieutenant-Colonel Robert Laycock; Lieutenant-Colonel Geoffrey Keyes, present throughout the planning stage, selected the most hazardous task of the attack on Rommel's headquarters for himself. Some weeks earlier, Rommel had moved his headquarters nearer to Tobruk to be close to the action. Rommel was not even in North Africa during Flipper, having gone to Rome to request replacements for supply ships sunk by the British.

Raid

10–14/15 November

On 10 November,  carried Keyes, Captain Robin Campbell, Lieutenant Roy Cooke and 25 men.  transported Laycock, Captain Glennie, Lieutenant David Macbeth Sutherland and 25 men from Alexandria. The beach lay near a place known as Hamama, some  behind Axis lines. Once ashore, they made contact with Haselden, delivered earlier by the Long Range Desert Group for reconnaissance. The weather deteriorated and Laycock's group had a much more difficult time getting ashore. Laycock and seven men landed but the rest were stranded on Talisman. With only 34 of the 59 men available, instead of four detachments attacking the targets, there were only to be three. Laycock remained at the rendezvous with three men to secure the beach, Keyes led his detachment of 25 men for the attack on Rommel's supposed headquarters, while Lieutenant Cooke took six men to destroy the communications facilities near Cyrene. Haselden's detachment completed its mission and was picked up by the LRDG.

15–18 November
Shortly before first light, Keyes' men moved to a wadi, where they sheltered until dark on the second night then moved off. Their Arab guide refused to accompany the party in the deteriorating weather. Hiding in a cave during the day, the detachment advanced to within a few hundred yards of the objective by 22:00 on the third night. At 23:59, Keyes led his party past sentries and other defences up to the house. Unable to find an open window or door, Keyes took advantage of Campbell's excellent German by having him pound on the front door and demand entrance. They set upon the sentry who opened the door. Campbell shot him and Keyes might have been wounded in the scuffle. The official version  is that Keyes opened the door to a nearby room, found Germans inside, closed it again abruptly, reopened it to hurl in a grenade and was shot by one of the Germans. Only one round was fired by the Germans during the raid on the HQ.

Keyes was taken outside but quickly died. Shortly afterwards, Campbell was accidentally shot in the leg by one of his own men. He passed command to Sergeant Jack Terry and remained behind. Terry gathered the raiding team and retreated with 17 men to rejoin Laycock at the beach. An Italian source, not explicit in naming the British names, points that Cooke's men encountered a platoon of Italian police paratroopers.

19 November
According to the source, 2nd Lieutenant Alfredo Sandulli Mercuro and the 3rd Platoon, 2nd Company, 1°  encountered what he thought was a band of Arabs hiding along a mountain ridge on 19 November. When called upon by Mercuro's Arab interpreter, the Italians were fired on and the paratroopers engaged what they now knew were British commandos, who withdrew to a cave. With no way out, the wounded commandos surrendered after Mercuro threatened to use flamethrowers on them. The paratroops took prisoner a group consisting of an officer, one NCO and three other ranks. Except for the officer, all the British were wounded and received medical treatment from the Italians. Mercuro searched the cave and found small arms and three demolition charges. The Italians suffered three wounded during the fight.

It proved impossible for the Laycock party to re-embark on the submarines and they waited for the weather to improve. They were discovered and exchanged fire with local Italian gendarmes (and German troops by some accounts). Aware that they could not hope to stand off the large force that was surely being organised, Laycock ordered the men to scatter. Laycock and Terry made it to safety after 37 days in the desert and Bombardier John Brittlebank, one of the SBS team who had guided the commandos in the folbots, escaped and survived alone in the desert for forty days until picked up by Allied troops. The rest of the raiding force was captured, some of them wounded. Contrary to some reports, only Keyes was killed by the Germans; one man had drowned during the landing.

Nominal roll
(Reconstructed by Michael Asher (2004), based on a list by Hans Edelmaier, amended from documentary and witness evidence, with the assistance of the Commando Association [now defunct]. It might contain errors.)

(Captured, unless otherwise noted.)
 Beach party
 Lt. Col. Robert Laycock, Royal Horse Guards (escaped)
 Sgt. Charles Nicol, Gordon Highlanders
 Bdr. George Dunn, Royal Artillery
 L/Cpl. Larry Codd, Royal Corps of Signals
 Pte. E.C. Atkins, Beds & Herts Regt
 Lt. John Pryor, Beds & Herts Regt & SBS (wounded and captured)
 Bdr.  John Brittlebank, Royal Artillery & SBS (escaped)
 Pte. Robert Fowler, Cameron Highlanders
  German HQ assault party
 Lt. Col Geoffrey Keyes, Royal Scots Greys (killed)
 Capt. Robin Campbell, General List (wounded and captured)
 Sgt. Jack Terry, Royal Artillery (escaped)
 L/Cpl. Dennis Coulthread, Royal Scots
 L/Bdr. A. Brodie, Royal Artillery
 Cpl/Interpreter Avishalom Drori (Palestine), 51 ME Commando
 German HQ covering party
 L/Cpl. William Pryde, Cameron Highlanders
 Cpl. A.E. Radcliffe,  RASC, (wounded and captured)
 Pte. John Phiminster, Cameron Highlanders
 L/Cpl. Frank Varney, Sherwood Foresters
 Bdr. Joseph Kearney, (Newfoundland) Royal Artillery
 L/Cpl.  Malcolm Hughes, Manchester Regt
 Cpl. William Heavyside, Yorks & Lancs Regt
 German HQ outside covering party
 Sgt. Charles Bruce, Black Watch [Royal Highland Regt]
 Cpl. Charles Lock,  London Scottish [Gordon Highlanders]
 Pte. James Bogle, Gordon Highlanders
 Pte. Robert Murray, Highland Light Infantry
 Cyrene crossroads party
 Lt. Roy Cooke, Royal W. Kent Regt
 Sgt.  Frederick Birch, Liverpool Scottish [Cameron Highlanders]
 Cpl. John Kerr, Cameron Highlanders
 Gnr. James Gornall, Royal Artillery
 L/Bdr. Terence O'Hagen, Royal Artillery
 Gnr. P. Macrae, Royal Artillery
 Pte. Charles Paxton, Cameron Highlanders

Aftermath
On 17 November 1941, the day of the raid, Rommel was in Italy, having left for Rome on 1 November, which became known to British military intelligence via Ultra on 17 November and that he was due back in Africa on 18 November. An emergency signal was sent to Middle East Command but was too late to stop the operation. On 15 November, a decrypt of an Italian C 38m machine cipher had revealed that the Italians knew from diverse sources that a British landing was imminent near Apollonia.

The German historian Hans Edelmaier suggests that Rommel was not the objective of the raid and his name not featuring in the plan supports this. There is no proof that Haselden reported Rommel's presence at the house in Beda and it has never been explained how Rommel was to be found or recognised by the commando unit. The only extant evidence that Rommel was the object of the raid came from a witness, Gunner Jim Gornall, who related that Keyes briefed the men on board the Torbay that their objective was to "get Rommel". When news of the raid reached him, Rommel was said to be indignant that the British should believe his headquarters was  behind the front; Rommel preferred to be near the front line with his troops.

Casualties
The British suffered two men killed, 28 captured (three wounded) and three men escaped; German casualties were four killed and three wounded. Keyes' body and those of the four dead Germans were buried with military honours on Rommel's orders in a local Catholic cemetery. For his actions Keyes was posthumously awarded the Victoria Cross. The citation for the award was written by Robert Laycock, who contrary to British military custom, was not a witness to Keyes' actions on the night in which he was killed. Almost none of the statements in the citation are verifiable and some contradict witness accounts.

Sergeant Jack Terry was awarded the Distinguished Conduct Medal (DCM) and Bombardier John Brittlebank (SBS) later received the DCM for actions including the Rommel Raid. Gunner Jim Gornall was awarded the Military Medal (MM). (Another attempt, this time by an SAS group, was made to kidnap or assassinate Rommel in Operation Gaff in July 1944 but Rommel had suffered skull fractures in an RAF attack eleven days earlier.)

See also 

 List of British military equipment of World War II
 List of German military equipment of World War II
 List of Italian military equipment in World War II

Notes

References

Bibliography

External links
 Operation Flipper, Rommel's HQ, 14/18 November 1941 combinedops.com
 HQ Operation Flipper, the Raid on Rommel's HQ combinedops.com

North African campaign
Western Desert campaign
Libya in World War II
Conflicts in 1941
World War II British Commando raids
Military operations of World War II involving Germany
Battles and operations of World War II involving Italy
1941 in Africa
Erwin Rommel
F
Amphibious operations involving the United Kingdom